Laevipilina rolani is a species of monoplacophoran, a superficially limpet-like marine mollusk. It is found off the northern coast of Spain.

References

Monoplacophora
Molluscs described in 1990